Ühikarotid is an Estonian teen drama TV series that airs on Kanal 2. The series first aired on 8 March 2010. It's written by Martin Algus and produced by Tuuli Roosma. It's about students from different Estonian locations who spend their time in a student's dormitory in Tallinn.

Cast

References

External links
Ühikarotid online

2010 Estonian television series debuts
2010s Estonian television series
2010s teen drama television series
Kanal 2 original programming